Charters Towers State High School (CTSHS) is a public high school in Charters Towers City, Charters Towers, Queensland, Australia. It was established in 1912 and is one of the oldest state secondary schools in Queensland.

References

External links 
 

Public high schools in Queensland
Schools in North Queensland
Charters Towers City, Queensland
Educational institutions established in 1912
1912 establishments in Australia